Micropolis Corporation (styled as MICROPΩLIS) was a disk drive company located in Chatsworth, California and founded in 1976. Micropolis initially manufactured high capacity (for the time) hard-sectored 5.25-inch floppy drives and controllers, later manufacturing hard drives using SCSI and ESDI interfaces.

History

Micropolis's first advance was to take the existing 48 tpi (tracks per inch) standard created by Shugart Associates, and double both the track density and track recording density to get four times the total storage on a 5.25-inch floppy in the "MetaFloppy" series with quad density (Drives :1054, :1053, and :1043) around 1980. Micropolis pioneered 100 tpi density because of the attraction of an exact 100 tracks to the inch. "Micropolis-compatible" 5.25-inch 77-track diskette drives were also manufactured by Tandon (TM100-3M and TM100-4M). Such drives were used in a number of computers like in a Vector Graphic S-100 bus computer, the Durango F-85 and in a few Commodore disk drives (8050, 8250, 8250LP and SFD-1001).

Micropolis later switched to 96 tpi when Shugart went to the 96 tpi standard, based on exact doubling of the 48 tpi standard. This allowed for backwards compatibility for reading by double stepping to read 48 tpi disks.

Micropolis entered the hard disk business with an 8-inch hard drive, following Seagate's lead (Seagate was the next company Alan Shugart founded after Shugart Associates was sold). They later followed with a 5.25-inch hard drive. Micropolis started to manufacture drives in Singapore in 1986. Manufacturing of 3.5-inch hard disks started in 1991.

Micropolis was one of the many hard drive manufacturers in the 1980s and 1990s that went out of business, merged, or closed their hard drive divisions; as a result of capacities and demand for products increased, and profits became hard to find. While Micropolis was able to hold on longer than many of the others, it ultimately sold its hard drive business to Singapore Technology (ST) in 1996, a subsidiary of Temasek Holdings), who has ceased to market the brand in 1998.

After the disk business sale, Micropolis was reorganized as StreamLogic Corporation, which declared bankruptcy in 1997 amid securities fraud allegations. StreamLogic's RAIDION line of storage subsystems survive,  marketed by the RAIDION Systems division of Peripheral Technology Group. Its VIDEON video on demand technology was sold to Sumitomo Corporation.

Emerging from the StreamLogic reorganization was yet another company named Hammer Storage Solutions, which was formed from the purchase of the hardware division of FWB, a small Macintosh storage vendor. Its assets were sold in 2000 to Bell Microproducts.

See also
 Group Coded Recording (GCR)
 Micropolis Disk Operating System (MDOS)
 Micropolis Z80 Operating System (MZOS)
 List of floppy disk controllers#Micropolis-FDC

References

Further reading

 http://www.s100computers.com/Hardware%20Folder/Vector%20Graphic/VG%20Micropolis%20FDC/VG%20Micropolis%20FDC.htm Micropolis/Vector Graphic S-100 FDC

External links

 (NB. An (incomplete) list of hard disk drives produced by Micropolis.)
 http://retrotechnology.com/herbs_stuff/d_micropolis.html
 http://www.retrotechnology.com/herbs_stuff/tandon_TM100.html
DigiSAFE
RAIDION Systems (Now defunct)
Hammer Storage division of Bell Microproducts
Marcus Bennett's incomplete Micropolis Documentation resource

American companies established in 1976
American companies disestablished in 1997
Technology companies based in Greater Los Angeles
Computer companies established in 1976
Computer companies disestablished in 1997
Computer storage companies
Defunct computer companies of the United States
Defunct technology companies based in California